Tiong Bahru Social Club (Chinese: 中峇鲁俱乐部) is a 2020 Singaporean satirical black comedy art film. The film tells the story of a simple man who accidentally becomes a happiness agent in an artificial intelligence cult community named Tiong Bahru Social Club, which aims to become the happiest neighbourhood in town.

It was released on 10 December 2020 in Singaporean cinemas.

Synopsis
Just fired from his job, 30-year-old Ah Bee then signs up as a young Happiness Agent with Tiong Bahru Social Club, a planned community project using data to build the happiest neighbourhood in an ageing Singaporean district. In this place where society has embraced artificial intelligence that will allow them to help people to learn what to do based on big data, and even matches their lovers. He moves into the communal house and finds himself in a strange cult of happiness and technology. He is now tasked with taking care of an elderly aunt, and he even meets a girl. Things seem to look brighter and better, but he soon realizes that something is going wrong. How will his story go?

Cast 
 Yao as Ah Bee
 Guat Kian Goh as Mui
 Jalyn Han as Miss Wee
 Benjamin Lee as Uncle Mok
 Noorlinah Mohamed as Haslinna
 Jo Tan as Geok
 Munah Bagharib as Orked
 Mochi
 Imran Shafie as Happiness Agent

Production
The film is Tan Bee Thiam's solo directorial debut. He previously co-directed local indie films Fundamentally Happy (2015) with Lei Yuan Bin, and produced Snakeskin (2015) and As You Were (2014).

Release
The film served as the opening film at the 2020 Singapore International Film Festival on 26 November 2020.

The film was invited for a screening at the 20th New York Asian Film Festival. It was featured in Uncaged Award for Best Feature Film Competition section and screened at Lincoln Center and SVA Theatre in the two-week festival held from 6 to 22 August 2021 in New York.

See also
 Bigbug - A 2022 science fiction film with a similar theme
 Down and Out in the Magic Kingdom - A 2003 science fiction novel with a similar theme
 Men, Women & Children - A 2014 film with a similar theme
 Nosedive - An episode of television series Black Mirror which also has similar theme

Notes

References

External links
 

Singaporean black comedy films
Singaporean independent films
2020 films
2020 black comedy films
2020s satirical films
2020 independent films
Utopian films
Films about artificial intelligence
Government by algorithm in fiction
Social reputation in fiction
English-language Singaporean films